The following is a list of Australian Army medical units in World War I.

Field Ambulance

1st Division (Australia) 
 1st Australian Field Ambulance (New South Wales)
 2nd Australian Field Ambulance (Victoria)
 3rd Australian Field Ambulance

2nd Division (Australia) 
 5th Australian Field Ambulance (New South Wales)
 6th Australian Field Ambulance (Victoria)
 7th Australian Field Ambulance

3rd Division (Australia) 
 9th Australian Field Ambulance (New South Wales)
 10th Australian Field Ambulance (Victoria)
 11th Australian Field Ambulance (South Australia)

4th Division (Australia) 
 4th Australian Field Ambulance
 12th Australian Field Ambulance
 13th Australian Field Ambulance

5th Division (Australia) 
 8th Australian Field Ambulance (NSW)
 14th Australian Field Ambulance
 15th Australian Field Ambulance

6th Division 
(Only partially formed, and was disbanded prior to completion of assembly.)
 16th Australian Field Ambulance
 17th Australian Field Ambulance

Light Horse Field Ambulance

ANZAC Mounted Division 
 1st Australian Light Horse Field Ambulance
 2nd Australian Light Horse Field Ambulance
 3rd Australian Light Horse Field Ambulance (to 1916)

Australian Mounted Division 
 3rd Australian Light Horse Field Ambulance (from 1917)
 4th Australian Light Horse Field Ambulance
 5th Australian Light Horse Field Ambulance

Camel Field Ambulance 
 Camel Field Ambulance

Casualty Clearing Station 
 1st Australian Casualty Clearing Station
 2nd Australian Casualty Clearing Station
 3rd Australian Casualty Clearing Station

Stationary Hospital 
 1st Australian Stationary Hospital (South Australia)
 2nd Australian Stationary Hospital (Western Australia)

Infectious Diseases Hospital 
 1st Dermatological Hospital
 2nd Infectious Diseases Hospital
 3rd Infectious Diseases Hospital
 4th Infectious Diseases Hospital (Queensland)
 5th Infectious Diseases Hospital (Victoria)
 6th Infectious Diseases Hospital (South Australia)

Australian Flying Corps Hospital 
 Australian Flying Corps Hospital

Australian General Hospital 
 1st Australian General Hospital (Queensland) – Heliopolis, Egypt January 1915 to March 1916; Rouen, France to 1918; then Sutton Veny, England
 2nd Australian General Hospital (New South Wales)
 3rd Australian General Hospital (New South Wales) - Mudros, Greece July 1915 to January 1916; Abbassia, Egypt to October 1916;  Abbeville, France from May 1917 until end of war
 4th Australian General Hospital (New South Wales)
 5th Australian General Hospital (Victoria)
 6th Australian General Hospital (Queensland)
 7th Australian General Hospital (South Australia)
 8th Australian General Hospital (Western Australia)
 9th Australian General Hospital (Tasmania)
 10th Australian General Hospital
 11th Australian General Hospital (Victoria)
 12th Australian General Hospital (Tasmania)
 13th Australian General Hospital (Queensland)
 14th Australian General Hospital
 15th Australian General Hospital (South Australia)
 16th Australian General Hospital (Victoria)
 17th Australian General Hospital (Queensland)

Australian Auxiliary Hospitals 
 1st Australian Auxiliary Hospital (1)
 1st Australian Auxiliary Hospital (2)
 2nd Australian Auxiliary Hospital (1)
 2nd Australian Auxiliary Hospital (2)
 3rd Australian Auxiliary Hospital (1)
 3rd Australian Auxiliary Hospital (2)
 4th Australian Auxiliary Hospital (1)
 4th Australian Auxiliary Hospital (2)
 5th Australian Auxiliary Hospital
 6th Australian Auxiliary Hospital
 7th Australian Auxiliary Hospital (Queensland)
 8th Australian Auxiliary Hospital (Queensland)
 9th Australian Auxiliary Hospital (Queensland)
 10th Australian Auxiliary Hospital (Queensland)
 11th Australian Auxiliary Hospital (1) (New South Wales)
 11th Australian Auxiliary Hospital (2) (New South Wales)
 12th Australian Auxiliary Hospital (New South Wales)
 13th Australian Auxiliary Hospital (New South Wales)
 14th Australian Auxiliary Hospital (New South Wales)
 15th Australian Auxiliary Hospital (Victoria)
 16th Australian Auxiliary Hospital (Victoria)
 17th Australian Auxiliary Hospital (South Australia)
 18th Australian Auxiliary Hospital (South Australia)
 19th Australian Auxiliary Hospital (Western Australia)
 20th Australian Auxiliary Hospital (Western Australia)
 21st Australian Auxiliary Hospital (1) (Western Australia)
 21st Australian Auxiliary Hospital (2) (New South Wales)
 22nd Australian Auxiliary Hospital (Western Australia)
 23rd Australian Auxiliary Hospital (Tasmania)
 24th Australian Auxiliary Hospital (Western Australia)
 25th Australian Auxiliary Hospital (Tasmania)
 26th Australian Auxiliary Hospital (Western Australia)
 27th Australian Auxiliary Hospital (Queensland)
 28th Australian Auxiliary Hospital (New South Wales)

Sanitary Sections 
 1st Australian Sanitary Company
 1st Australian Sanitary Section [Second Division]
 2nd Australian Sanitary Section [First Division]
 3rd Australian Sanitary Section (Queensland) [Third Division]
 4th Australian Sanitary Section [Fourth Division]
 5th Australian Sanitary Section [Fifth Division]
 6th Australian Sanitary Section – Tell El Kebir Australian Imperial Force Training Base at the Suez Canal in Egypt, later moved to England with the Australian Imperial Force Training Centre
 7th Australian Sanitary Section [Anzac Mounted Division]
 8th Australian Sanitary Section [Australian Mounted Division]
 9th Australian Sanitary Section [Sixth Division]

Special Medical Units 
 Anzac Field Laboratory
 Base Depot of Medical Stores

Convalescent and Command Depots

Convalescent Depot 
 1st Australian Convalescent Depot (1)
 1st Australian Convalescent Depot (2)
 2nd Australian Convalescent Depot
 3rd Australian Convalescent Depot
 4th Australian Convalescent Depot
 5th Australian Convalescent Depot
 6th Australian Convalescent Depot (Victoria)
 7th Australian Convalescent Depot (Victoria)
 8th Australian Convalescent Depot (Victoria)

Command Depot 
 1st Australian Command Depot
 2nd Australian Command Depot
 3rd Australian Command Depot
 4th Australian Command Depot

Hospital Ships 
 1st Hospital Ship A63 HMAHS Karoola
 2nd Hospital Ship A61 HMAHS Kanowna
 Hospital Ship A55 HMAT Kyarra – later converted to a troop transport

Temporary Hospital Ships 
 RMS Aquitania
 SS Grantala
 SS Ryarra

See also 
 Military history of Australia during World War I
 First Australian Imperial Force dental units

References

Medical
Army medical units and formations of Australia